Elmore is a small town in Victoria north-east of Bendigo on the Campaspe River. Elmore is close to the Whipstick State Park.

History
In the 1840s a small settlement developed on the Campaspe River servicing pastoral runs.  The Post Office opened on 1 January 1849 as Bertram's Inn. On 1 January 1850 it was renamed Campaspie (sic). In 1864 when the township was established the name became Runnymede and in around 1882 the name was changed again to Elmore.

A Court of Petty Sessions opened at Elmore on 17 December 1965, despite its proximity to the then-existing court at Rochester. in 1971 along with other Courts of Petty Sessions and closed on 1 January 1983, having sat for only 24 hours and heard 280 cases in 1981.

The Town today
Local businesses include a branch of the Bendigo Bank, café, wine store, fish and chip shop, IGA supermarket, BP petrol station, the Shamrock Hotel, a two-storey old building slowly being restored to its original state, the Railway Hotel, the Victoria Hotel, the Elmore Bakery, the Elmore Pharmacy and a medical centre. A railway station is also located in Elmore.

In the first week of October one of Australia's oldest and largest field days is held at Elmore.  In 2004 there were 45,000 visitors.  The first field day was held at Elmore in 1964.  There is now a permanent site with pavilions, conference rooms and catering facilities which are hired out.

In January 2007, the Elmore Events Centre was the location of the 2007 Australian Scout Jamboree, the 21st Australian Jamboree.  Over 13,000 people attended from 22 different countries and all of the Australian states and territories. Elmore Events Centre will again host the 2022 Australian Scout Jamboree, the 26th Australian Jamboree.

The town has an Australian Rules football team playing in the Heathcote District Football League.

Golfers play at the course of the Elmore Golf Club on Hunter Road.

Elmore is also noted for being the home of the famous  Elmore Oil, a product invented by longtime Elmore resident, Ralph Linford. Elmore Oil is a natural oil used for the relief of arthritis pain and was invented by Ralph in 1998. Elmore Oil uses the well-known eucalyptus oil grown locally in the region.

References

External links

 About Elmore
 Elmore field days - website

Towns in Victoria (Australia)
Bendigo
Suburbs of Bendigo